Riverboat Rhythm is a 1946 American comedy film directed by Leslie Goodwins and written by Charles E. Roberts. The film stars Leon Errol, Glenn Vernon, Walter Catlett, Joan Newton, Marc Cramer, and Jonathan Hale. The film was released on February 13, 1946, by RKO Radio Pictures.

Plot
Matt Lindsay (Leon Errol) is the owner of a broken-down showboat, perpetually one small step ahead of his creditors and the law. At one point, he disguises himself as Col. Witherspoon, a con artist he'd met earlier, only to find himself in the middle of a blood feud with Col. Beeler, who aims to settle things once and for all—with a pistol.

Production
Riverboat Rhythm was originally conceived in September 1944 as a vehicle for its juvenile musical-comedy team of Glenn Vernon and Marcy McGuire. When RKO suddenly released McGuire, Vernon suggested his erstwhile Broadway co-star Joan Newton to fill McGuire's role. The project was retooled as a Leon Errol comedy along the lines of his Mexican Spitfire features, with Spitfire veterans Charles E. Roberts and Leslie Goodwins writing and directing, respectively. Errol joined the cast in May 1945 as "Matt Lindsay," the familiar character he'd played in the Spitfire comedies, and the script gave him opportunities for mistaken-identity masquerades (a Spitfire hallmark).

Cast
 Leon Errol as Matt Lindsay
 Glenn Vernon as John Beeler 
 Walter Catlett as Colonel Jeffrey "Smitty" Witherspoon
 Marc Cramer as Lionel Beeler
 Jonathan Hale as Colonel Edward Beeler
 Joan Newton as Midge Lindsay
 Emory Parnell as Sheriff Martin
 Harry Harvey, Sr. as Ezra Beeler
 Florence Lake as Penelope Beeler Witherspoon
 Dorothy Vaughan as Belle Crowley
 Ben Carter as Benjamin 
 Mantan Moreland as Mantan
 Frankie Carle and His Orchestra

References

External links
 
 
 
 

1946 films
American black-and-white films
RKO Pictures films
Films directed by Leslie Goodwins
American comedy films
1946 comedy films
1940s English-language films
1940s American films